Stillwater County is a county in the U.S. state of Montana. As of the 2020 census, the population was 8,963. Its county seat is Columbus.

Geography

Major highways
  Interstate 90
  U.S. Highway 10 (Former)
  Montana Highway 78

Adjacent counties

 Golden Valley County - north
 Yellowstone County - east
 Carbon County - south
 Park County - southwest
 Sweet Grass County - west

National protected areas
 Custer National Forest (part)
 Grass Lake National Wildlife Refuge
 Hailstone National Wildlife Refuge

Demographics

2000 census
As of the 2000 United States census, there were 8,195 people, 3,234 households, and 2,347 families in the county. The population density was 5 people per square mile (2/km2). There were 3,947 housing units at an average density of 2 per square mile (1/km2). The racial makeup of the county was 96.82% White, 0.13% Black or African American, 0.70% Native American, 0.21% Asian, 0.02% Pacific Islander, 0.94% from other races, and 1.18% from two or more races. 2.01% of the population were Hispanic or Latino of any race. 29.7% were of German, 11.8% Norwegian, 10.8% English, 10.6% Irish and 6.8% American ancestry.

There were 3,234 households, out of which 32.60% had children under the age of 18 living with them, 64.60% were married couples living together, 5.00% had a female householder with no husband present, and 27.40% were non-families. 24.10% of all households were made up of individuals, and 9.60% had someone living alone who was 65 years of age or older.  The average household size was 2.48 and the average family size was 2.94.

The county population contained 25.30% under the age of 18, 5.70% from 18 to 24, 26.90% from 25 to 44, 27.60% from 45 to 64, and 14.50% who were 65 years of age or older. The median age was 41 years. For every 100 females there were 104.00 males. For every 100 females age 18 and over, there were 102.80 males.

The median income for a household in the county was $39,205, and the median income for a family was $45,238. Males had a median income of $32,148 versus $19,271 for females. The per capita income for the county was $18,468. About 6.20% of families and 9.80% of the population were below the poverty line, including 12.20% of those under age 18 and 9.20% of those age 65 or over.

2010 census
As of the 2010 United States census, there were 9,117 people, 3,796 households, and 2,657 families in the county. The racial makeup of the county was 96.8% white, 0.8% American Indian, 0.3% Asian, 0.1% black or African American, 0.4% from other races, and 1.6% from two or more races. Those of Hispanic or Latino origin made up 2.3% of the population. In terms of ancestry, 34.7% were German, 14.1% were Irish, 14.0% were English, 10.8% were Norwegian, and 6.9% were American.

Of the 3,796 households, 28.9% had children under the age of 18 living with them, 60.6% were married couples living together, 6.0% had a female householder with no husband present, 30.0% were non-families, and 25.8% of all households were made up of individuals. The average household size was 2.37 and the average family size was 2.84. The median age was 45.7 years.

The median income for a household in the county was $57,227 and the median income for a family was $65,438. Males had a median income of $51,830 versus $26,909 for females. The per capita income for the county was $27,168. About 6.0% of families and 9.5% of the population were below the poverty line, including 17.9% of those under age 18 and 7.2% of those age 65 or over.

Politics
Stillwater County is a heavily Republican county in presidential elections. It has not voted for a Democratic presidential candidate since Franklin D. Roosevelt in 1936.

Communities

Town
 Columbus (county seat)

Census-designated places
 Absarokee

 Fishtail

 Nye

 Park City

 Rapelje

 Reed Point

Unincorporated communities

 Beehive
 Dean
 Meyers Creek (partial)
 Molt
 Reed Point

Ghost towns
 Limestone
 Springtime
 Wheat Basin

See also
 List of lakes in Stillwater County, Montana
 List of mountains in Stillwater County, Montana
 National Register of Historic Places listings in Stillwater County, Montana

References

Further reading
 
 

 
1913 establishments in Montana
Populated places established in 1913